The men's 110 metres hurdles event at the 1970 British Commonwealth Games was held on 17 and 18 July at the Meadowbank Stadium in Edinburgh, Scotland. It was the first time that the metric distance was contested at the Games replacing the 120 yards hurdles.

Medalists

Results

Heats
Qualification: First 4 in each heat (Q) and the next 4 fastest (q) qualify for the semifinals.

Wind:Heat 1: +6.8 m/s, Heat 2: ? m/s, Heat 3: ? m/s

Semifinals
Held on 18 July

Qualification: First 4 in each semifinal (Q) qualify directly for the final.

Wind:Heat 1: +5.4 m/s, Heat 2: ? m/s

Final
Held on 18 July

Wind: +2.9 m/s

References

Heats results (p28)
Semifinals & Final results (p9)
Australian results

Athletics at the 1970 British Commonwealth Games
1970